Good Neighbor Policy or Good Neighbour Policy may refer to:

 Good Neighbor policy, an American foreign policy
 Good Neighbour Policy (horse racing), an agreement amongst horse racing jurisdictions
 Good Neighbor policy (LDS Church), reforms adopted by The Church of Jesus Christ of Latter-day Saints